P. D. Gwaltney Jr. House is a historic home located at Smithfield, Isle of Wight County, Virginia. The house was built about 1900, and is a large two-story, rectangular, Queen Anne style wood frame mansion with three porches. It features an elaborate profile punctuated by a corner turret, projecting bays, and a complex roof form.  It was the primary residence of Pembroke Decatur Gwaltney Jr. of the Gwaltney meat empire.

It was listed on the National Register of Historic Places in 1999.  It is located in the Smithfield Historic District.

The mansion remained in the Gwaltney family until 2016.

References

Houses on the National Register of Historic Places in Virginia
Queen Anne architecture in Virginia
Houses completed in 1900
Houses in Isle of Wight County, Virginia
National Register of Historic Places in Isle of Wight County, Virginia
Individually listed contributing properties to historic districts on the National Register in Virginia
Gilded Age mansions